Sugarfield is an unincorporated community in Yolo County, California.

References

External links

Unincorporated communities in California
Unincorporated communities in Yolo County, California